Myrmicocrypta is a Neotropical genus of fungus-growing ants in the subfamily Myrmicinae. The genus is known from Mexico to Argentina. Their colonies are generally small, consisting of fewer than 200 individuals.

Species

 Myrmicocrypta boliviana Weber, 1938
 Myrmicocrypta bruchi Santschi, 1936
 Myrmicocrypta buenzlii Borgmeier, 1934
 Myrmicocrypta collaris Emery, 1913
 Myrmicocrypta dilacerata (Forel, 1885)
 Myrmicocrypta ednaella Mann, 1922
 Myrmicocrypta elisabethae Weber, 1937
 Myrmicocrypta foreli Mann, 1916
 Myrmicocrypta godmani Forel, 1899
 Myrmicocrypta guianensis Weber, 1937
 Myrmicocrypta infuscata Weber, 1946
 Myrmicocrypta longinoda Weber, 1938
 Myrmicocrypta microphthalma Borgmeier, 1948
 Myrmicocrypta occipitalis Weber, 1938
 Myrmicocrypta ogloblini Santschi, 1936
 Myrmicocrypta rudiscapa Emery, 1913
 Myrmicocrypta spinosa Weber, 1937
 Myrmicocrypta squamosa Smith, 1860
 Myrmicocrypta subnitida Forel, 1899
 Myrmicocrypta triangulata Forel, 1912
 Myrmicocrypta tuberculata Weber, 1938
 Myrmicocrypta unidentata Weber, 1937
 Myrmicocrypta urichi Weber, 1937
 Myrmicocrypta weyrauchi Borgmeier, 1948

References

External links

Formicinae
Ant genera
Hymenoptera of North America
Hymenoptera of South America